The Taipei Municipal Nei-Hu Vocational High School , formerly Taipei Municipal Nei-Hu Industrial High School, abbreviated as NIHS (內湖高工) is a public 3-year high school in Neihu District, Taipei, Taiwan.

Departments
Department of Computer Science
Department of Control Engineering
Department of Electronics Engineering
Department of Electrical Engineering
Department of Refrigeration & Air-Conditioning
Department of Foreign Languages()

Notable people
Benson Chen (陳書賢) - News anchor
Lin Yun-ju (林昀儒) - Table tennis player
Stephen Hsu (許志豪) - Singer

See also
 Gangqian Station

External links

 Official website 
 Official website 

1986 establishments in Taiwan
High schools in Taiwan
Educational institutions established in 1986
Schools in Taipei